Kahin Aur Chal (English: "Let's Go Elsewhere") is a Hindi film that was released in 1968. It was written and directed by Vijay Anand and stars his older brother Dev Anand. Asha Parekh is the heroine. Shubha Khote, Madan Puri are part of the supporting cast. Shankar Jaikishan composed the music. Mohammed Rafi, Lata Mangeshkar and Asha Bhosle are the playback singers. It was produced by Jal Mistry, who was also the cinematographer.

Plot
It is a thriller in which the hero is suspected of a crime and is on the run.  Shail (Dev Anand) works as an engine driver, and he is devastated when he finds his wife Leela (Padma Chavan) having an affair with his friend Paul (Madan Puri). He shoots Paul and then runs away. Feeling guilty, he jumps into the water to kill himself. Rajni (Asha Parekh) finds him in the water and saves him. She nurses him back to health and they fall in love. However, Shail cannot forget his past. It turns out that Paul has survived, and he and Leela are spending Shail's money. Shail decides to take revenge with Rajni's help. A motif that happens throughout the film is that Rajni looks forward to the time when Shail's train reaches the station for two minutes, every day.

Cast
Dev Anand- Shail
Asha Parekh- Rajni
Madan Puri- Paul

Music
"O Laxmi O Sarsu, O Sheela, O Rajni Dekho Kya Kya Lekar Aaya" - Mohammed Rafi
"Dubate Huye Dil Ko Tinake Kaa Sahaaraa Bhi Nahin" - Mohammed Rafi
"Zindagi Seharaa Bhi Hai Aur Zindagi Gulashan Bhi Hai" - Lata Mangeshkar
"Re Aane Wale Aa" - Lata Mangeshkar
"Shokh Ankhe Dekh Kar Surat Per Pyar Aa Hi Gaya" - Mohammed Rafi, Asha Bhosle
"Pani Pe Barse Jab Pani" - Lata Mangeshkar

Reception

Leading lady Asha Parekh wrote in her 2017 memoir The Hit Girl:  "The project ran into financial problems, the end-result suffered, and did not fare well at the box office."

Trivia
Asha Parekh wrote in her memoir that she found the song "Zindagi Sehra Bhi Hai" to be melodious, which she often listens to online.

References

External links
 

Films directed by Vijay Anand
Films scored by Shankar–Jaikishan
1960s Hindi-language films
1968 films